Alexander Barnett (born November 21, 1986) is an American former basketball player, best known for his college career at Dartmouth College, where he was the 2009 Ivy League Player of the Year.

A 6'6" small forward, Barnett was recruited to Dartmouth from Cardinal Ritter College Prep High School in St. Louis, Missouri. He was a three-year starter for the Big Green, increasing his scoring average in each of his four college seasons. As a senior, Barnett averaged 19.4 points per game and was named the Ivy League Player of the Year and an honorable mention All-American by the Associated Press.

Following the close of his college career, Barnett signed with Cholet Basket of the French LNB Pro A. He played for three clubs in his one professional season, also suiting up for Nantes in LNB Pro B and in Finland for FoKoPo.

References

External links
Dartmouth Big Green profile
French League profile
Finnish League profile
College stats @ sports-reference.com

1986 births
Living people
American expatriate basketball people in Finland
American expatriate basketball people in France
American men's basketball players
Basketball players from St. Louis
Cholet Basket players
Dartmouth Big Green men's basketball players
Small forwards